Peggy A. Rosenzweig (born November 5, 1936) is a former member of the Wisconsin State Senate and the Wisconsin State Assembly. She served in the Wisconsin Legislature from 1983 to 2003.

Political career
Before being elected to the Assembly, she worked as director of community relations for the Milwaukee Regional Medical Center and a consultant for the Independence Bank of Wauwatosa.

Rosenzweig began her career in the Wisconsin Legislature as another later ended it, challenging a long-time incumbent Republican for the nomination. She defeated George Klicka in the September 1982 primaries 3,487 to 2,752, before defeating Democrat James Bottoni in the general election, 12,773 to 7,536.

In April 1993, Rosenzweig won a special election against Democrat David Cullen for an open seat in the Wisconsin State Senate. She was unseated in the 2002 primaries by fellow Republican Thomas G. Reynolds, who claimed she was too liberal on issues such as abortion and gun-control. The election may have been influenced by the redrawing of the 5th Senate District after the 2000 census, which increased its proportion of Republicans.

In 2003, Rosenzweig was appointed to the Board of Regents of the University of Wisconsin System by governor Jim Doyle, serving until 2008.

In 2006, Rosenzweig was appointed to the board of the Wisconsin Technical College System.

Personal life and education
Born in Detroit, Michigan, Rosenzweig graduated from the University of Wisconsin–Milwaukee in 1978 with a degree in political science. She also attended Juilliard for two semesters in the early 1950s. Rosenzweig is married to David Y. Rosenzweig, a doctor and professor at the Medical College of Wisconsin. As of 2011, she had five adult children and twelve grandchildren. She lives in Wauwatosa, Wisconsin.

Rosenzweig is Jewish, having been raised in the Reform tradition.

Electoral history

2002 State Senate GOP Primary
Tom Reynolds-55%
Peggy Rozenzweig (inc)-45%

Notes

External links

|-

|-

|-

Politicians from Detroit
People from Wauwatosa, Wisconsin
University of Wisconsin–Milwaukee alumni
Members of the Wisconsin State Assembly
Wisconsin state senators
Jewish American state legislators in Wisconsin
Women state legislators in Wisconsin
1936 births
Living people
21st-century American Jews
21st-century American women